Northmoor  or North Moor may refer to:

Places
 Northmoor, Devon, England
 Northmoor, Dulverton, an estate in Somerset, England
 Northmoor, Oxfordshire, England
 Northmoor, Missouri, USA
 Northmoor Country Club, a golf course in Highland Park, Illinois, USA, and site of the 1975 Illinois Open Championship
 Northmoor Green a village in Somerset, England
 North Moor, a protected area in Scotland

Fiction
 Northmoor, a plutonium processing plant in the BBC drama Edge of Darkness